Uroš Predić (born August 11, 1973) is a retired Serbian football midfielder.

Playing career
Predić began his career in the First League of FR Yugoslavia with FK Hajduk Kula in 1996. In 1998, he signed with FK Vojvodina and played in the 1998 UEFA Intertoto Cup. Before he went abroad he had a stint with FK Rad. In 2000, he played with Wisła Płock in the Ekstraklasa. During his time in Poland he also played with Zagłębie Lubin in 2003. The following season he returned to Serbia to play with FK Mladost Lučani, and went to China in 2002 to sign with Beijing Guoan.

In 2004, he returned to his homeland to play with Hajduk, and Budućnost Banatski Dvor. He went a third time abroad to play with Khazar Lankaran FK in the Azerbaijan Premier League. In 2005, he was loaned to Doncaster Rovers F.C. in the Football League One. He finished his career in Canada near the end of the 2006 season, where he signed for Serbian White Eagles FC. He featured in the CSL Championship final against Italia Shooters, where they were defeated 1-0.

References

Living people
1973 births
Footballers from Novi Sad
Serbian footballers
Serbian expatriate footballers
FK Hajduk Kula players
FK Vojvodina players
FK Rad players
Serbian expatriate sportspeople in Poland
Wisła Płock players
Serbian expatriate sportspeople in Canada
Zagłębie Lubin players
Expatriate footballers in Poland
Beijing Guoan F.C. players
Expatriate footballers in China
Khazar Lankaran FK players
Expatriate footballers in Azerbaijan
Doncaster Rovers F.C. players
Expatriate footballers in England
Serbian White Eagles FC players
Canadian Soccer League (1998–present) players
Expatriate soccer players in Canada
Association football midfielders
Serbian expatriate sportspeople in China
FK Budućnost Banatski Dvor players
First League of Serbia and Montenegro players
Ekstraklasa players
Azerbaijan Premier League players